Memecylon flavescens is a species of plant in the family Melastomataceae. It is endemic to India.  It is threatened by habitat loss.

References

Endemic flora of India (region)
flavescens
Endangered plants
Taxonomy articles created by Polbot